The 2011 European Junior Baseball Championship was an under-18 international baseball competition held in Gijón, Spain from July 4 to July 10, 2011. It featured teams from Belgium, Czech Republic, France, Germany, Italy, Lithuania, Netherlands, Russia, Spain and Ukraine.

Round 1

Pool A

Standings

Schedule and results

Pool B

Standings

Schedule and results

Round 2

Pool C

Standings

Schedule and results

Semi-finals

Final round

5th place game

Bronze medal game

Gold medal game

Final standings

External links
Game Results

References

European Junior Baseball Championship
European Junior Baseball Championship
2011